Tetrathemis ruwensoriensis is a species of dragonfly in the family Libellulidae. It is endemic to Uganda.  Its natural habitats are subtropical or tropical moist montane forests and rivers. It is threatened by habitat loss.

References

Sources

Libellulidae
Endemic fauna of Uganda
Insects of Uganda
Taxonomy articles created by Polbot
Insects described in 1941